Stephens v. Cady, 55 U.S. 528 (1853), was a United States Supreme Court case in which the Court held a copyright is a property in notion, and has no corporeal tangible substance, so it cannot be seized or sold in an execution sale.

This case is closely related to Stevens v. Gladding.

References

External links
 

1853 in United States case law
United States copyright case law
United States Supreme Court cases
United States Supreme Court cases of the Taney Court